Sarcoglycan zeta also known as SGCZ is a protein which in humans is encoded by the SGCZ gene.

Function 

The zeta-sarcoglycan gene measures over 465 kb and localizes to 8p22. This protein is part of the sarcoglycan complex, a group of 6 proteins. The sarcoglycans are all N-glycosylated transmembrane proteins with a short intra-cellular domain, a single transmembrane region and a large extra-cellular domain containing a carboxyl-terminal cluster with several conserved cysteine residues. The sarcoglycan complex is part of the dystrophin-associated glycoprotein complex (DGC), which bridges the inner cytoskeleton and the extracellular matrix.

Clinical significance 

Zeta-sarcoglycan is reduced in mouse models of muscular dystrophy and SGCZ is found as a component of the vascular smooth muscle sarcoglycan complex. Hence SGCZ  may be important in the pathogenesis of muscular dystrophy.

References

External links
 LOVD mutation database: SGCZ

Further reading